The 2002 Railway Cup Hurling Championship was the 75th series of the inter-provincial hurling Railway Cup. Four matches were played between 2 November 2002 and 3 November 2002 to decide the title. It was contested by Connacht, Leinster, Munster and Ulster.

Munster entered the championship as the defending champions.

On 3 November 2002, Leinster won the Railway Cup after a 4-15 to 3-17 defeat of Munster in the final at Nowlan Park, Kilkenny. It was their 22nd Railway Cup title overall and their first title since 1997.  In the Railway Shield final, Connacht defeated Ulster by 0-19 to 0-16.

Leinster's Eddie Brennan (2-06) and Henry Shefflin (0-12) were the Railway Cup joint top scorers.

Results

Semi-finals

Shield final

Final

Top scorers

Overall

Single game

Sources

 Donegan, Des, The Complete Handbook of Gaelic Games (DBA Publications Limited, 2005).

References

Railway Cup Hurling Championship
Railway Cup Hurling Championship